MV S.E. Graham was an oil tanker that was built in 1943 and operated by the Graham Company until her loss in 1958.

The collision triggered a fire that engulfed both ships until they drifted apart and grounded separately. On SS Gulfoil, 18 of the crew were burned; 17 bodies were recovered, while one was listed as missing—while all of S.E. Graham's crew survived. Survivors were retrieved by the Coast Guard cutter Laurel and various Coast Guard and Navy small craft.

S.E. Graham burned for most of the day, and was declared a total loss, while Gulfoil was salvaged and eventually rebuilt for service on the Great Lakes.

References

1943 ships
Maritime incidents in 1958